The 2021 Central Europe Cup was a Twenty20 International (T20I) cricket tournament played in Prague between 21 and 23 May 2021. The participating teams were the hosts Czech Republic, along with Austria and Luxembourg. Malta were also due to take part, but were forced to withdraw due on 6 May due to COVID-19 restrictions. The tournament was played in a double round-robin format, with all matches hosted at the Vinoř Cricket Ground in Prague.

This was the seventh edition of the Central Europe Cup and the first to have T20I status. These were the first official T20I matches to be played in the Czech Republic since the International Cricket Council (ICC) granted full T20I status to all competitive matches between its members from 1 January 2019. The 2020 edition would have had T20I status but was cancelled due to the COVID-19 pandemic. The Czechs were the defending champions having defeated Hungary in the final of the 2019 edition. Austria won the tournament on their debut at the Central Europe Cup, winning three of their four matches.

Squads

The Czech squad was announced on 21 April 2021 with some notable omissions including all-rounder Honey Gori, fast bowler Kyle Gilham and opening batter Sumit Pokhriyal, due to a lack of availability. On 18 May 2021, The Czech's announced changes to their squad due to players originally selected becoming unavailable; Abul Farhad and Zahid Mahmood were replaced by Sagar Madhireddy and Smit Patel.

Points Table

Fixtures

References

External links
 Series home at ESPN Cricinfo

Associate international cricket competitions in 2021